Max Arbez (December 2, 1901 at Cousance – March 28, 1992 in Les Rousses) was a French hotelier-restaurateur, resistance fighter during World War II who was honored by Yad Vashem as one of the Righteous Among the Nations. On April 22, 2012, Arbez was posthumously recognized as Righteous Among the Nations by the Yad Vashem Institute and his wife, at the age of 102, received the Medal of Honor on his behalf on October 6, 2013.

Background 
In 1862, while the Franco-Swiss border was being redrawn, someone had a building built on the very route from the new border to the hamlet of La Cure in Saint-Cergue. Jules Arbez (born in 1874), Max's father, set up a hotel there: the Hôtel Arbez Franco-Suisse (now called the Hotel Arbez).  During World War II, Max Arbez assisted by his wife, Angèle Arbez, helped hundreds of Jews and resistance fighters to return sometimes to the free zone, sometimes to Switzerland.

During his lifetime, Max Arbez always refused any official recognition of his action during the war, believing that he had only ever done what his conscience dictated to him.

References 

1901 births
1992 deaths
Righteous Among the Nations
French Resistance
French Resistance members